Gwalior Glory High School is a school in Gwalior, Madhya Pradesh, India. It is affiliated to the Central Board of Secondary Education. The school evolved from a primary school established in Gwalior in 1991 to become a co-educational English-medium secondary school.

Classes
Gwalior Glory High School has classes from play group school through grade 12. The school is divided into six houses, each named after the famous Mountain Ranges from all over India. The houses are Himadri, Shivalik, Nilgiri, Vindhyanchal, Aravali, and Sahyadri.

References

External links

Primary schools in India
High schools and secondary schools in Madhya Pradesh
Schools in Gwalior
Educational institutions established in 1991
1991 establishments in Madhya Pradesh